Garrel is a municipality in the district of Cloppenburg, in Lower Saxony, Germany. It is situated approximately 15 km north of Cloppenburg, and 25 km southwest of Oldenburg.

People from Garrel 
 Heinrich Timmerevers (born 1952), German Roman Catholic bishop

References

Cloppenburg (district)